The 1992–93 Connecticut Huskies men's basketball team represented the University of Connecticut in the 1992–93 collegiate men's basketball season. The Huskies completed the season with a 15–13 overall record. The Huskies were members of the Big East Conference where they finished with a 9–9 record. They made it to the First Round in the 1993 National Invitation Tournament. The Huskies played their home games at Harry A. Gampel Pavilion in Storrs, Connecticut and the Hartford Civic Center in Hartford, Connecticut, and they were led by seventh-year head coach Jim Calhoun.

Schedule 

|-
!colspan=12 style=""| Regular Season

|-
!colspan=12 style=""| Big East tournament

|-
!colspan=12 style=""| NIT

Schedule Source:

References 

UConn Huskies men's basketball seasons
Connecticut Huskies
Connecticut
Connecticut Huskies men's basketball
Connecticut Huskies men's basketball